The men's long jump at the 2022 World Athletics U20 Championships was held at the Estadio Olímpico Pascual Guerrero on 1 and 2 August.

30 athletes from 24 countries were entered to the competition, however 26 athletes from 22 countries competed.

Records
U20 standing records prior to the 2022 World Athletics U20 Championships were as follows:

Results

Qualification
The qualification rounds took place on 1 August, in two groups, Group B started at 11:55 and Group A at 11:56. Athletes attaining a mark of at least 7.80 metres ( Q ) or at least the 12 best performers ( q ) qualified for the final.

Final
The final was started at 16:32 on 2 August.

References

long jump
Long jump at the World Athletics U20 Championships